Public Schools of Robeson County is a school district headquartered in Lumberton, North Carolina. It operates public schools in Robeson County.

 the district had about 23,000 students.

Schools

Secondary schools
 High schools
 Fairmont High School
 Lumberton High School
 Purnell Swett High School
 Red Springs High School
 St. Pauls High School
 Robeson Early College High School
 Middle schools
 Fairmont Middle School
 L. Gilbert Carroll Middle School
 Littlefield Middle School (see Littlefield High School)
 Lumberton Jr. High School
 Orrum Middle School
 Pembroke Middle School
 Red Springs Middle School
 South Robeson Middle School
 St. Pauls Middle School
 Townsend Middle School

Primary schools

 Deep Branch Elementary School
 East Robeson Elementary School
 Green Grove Elementary School
 W.H. Knuckles Elementary School
 Long Branch Elementary School
 Magnolia Elementary School
 Rowland Norment Elementary School
 Oxendine Elementary School
 Parkton Elementary School
 Pembroke Elementary School
 Peterson Elementary School
 Piney Grove Elementary School
 Prospect Elementary School
 Rex-Rennert Elementary School
 Rosenwald Elementary School
 St. Pauls Elementary School
 Tanglewood Elementary School
 Union Chapel Elementary School
 Union Elementary School

Other facilities
 Career Center
 Indian Education Resource Center
 Learning Accelerated Program
 PSRC Online
 Shining Stars Preschool

Facilities
The headquarters is in the Comtech Technology Park in Lumberton, along Interstate 95. It previously had a different office, but Hurricane Matthew damaged the facilities in 2016. The University of North Carolina Pembroke temporarily hosted the finance department of the school district.

References

External links
 Public Schools of Robeson County
Robeson
Education in Robeson County, North Carolina